Rowing has been a sport of  the Pan American Games since the 1951 games.

Medal table
Updated until 2019 edition.

References

 
Sports at the Pan American Games
Pan American Games
Pan American Games
Pan American Games